Michael Owen Jones (born 1942) is an American Folklorist and Emeritus Professor in the World Arts and Cultures/Dance Program at University of California, Los Angeles (UCLA).

Jones has wide-ranging research interests: he is particularly known for his research on folk medicine and on foodways but has also researched on other of genres of folklore including "folk belief, speech... arts and crafts and poetry".

Early life and education 
Jones studied at the University of Kansas, earning a BA in history, Art and Political Science in 1960. He studied Folklore at Indiana University earning a MA in 1964 and a Ph.D. (in Folklore and American Studies) in 1970.  His Ph.D. dissertation was titled 'Chairmaking in Appalachia; a study in style and creative imagination in American folk art'.

Career 
Jones moved to a position at UCLA in 1968 in the Folklore and Mythology Program and remained there for the entirety of his career. He was a founding member of UCLA's Interdepartmental Program in World Arts & Cultures in 1973.

Jones has conducted fieldwork in "Western Canada and the Maritimes as well as Appalachia, the Great Plains, and Southern California".

Jones has authored over 230 academic works. He was also a general editor of the Folk Art and Artists Series, University Press of Mississippi.

In 2021, Jones co-launched the Archive of Feeling, "one of the largest databases of medicinal folklore from around the world", based in part on material collected by Jones that became part of the UCLA Archive of American Folk Medicine.

Recognition 
He has received funding from a number of organisations, including the National Endowment for the Humanities, Skaggs Foundation, Canadian Museum of Civilization and the National Institutes of Health.

He is a Fellow of the American Folklore Society (AFS) and a former member of the AFS's executive board. He is also a former President of the AFS, serving in that role between 2004 and 2005.  His Presidential Address focused on foodways.

Jones is also a former President of the California Folklore Society and has served as a council member of the California Council for the Humanities.

He is a Woodrow Wilson Fellow and also a Fellow of the Finnish Academy of Sciences and Letters, and the Society for Applied Anthropology.

His book Frankenstein Was a Vegetarian: Essays on Food Choice, Identity, and Symbolism was nominated for the Bookseller/Diagram Prize for Oddest Title of the Year in 2022.

Selected publications 
 Owen Jones, Michael; National Museum of Man (Canada) (1972). Why faith healing?. National Museum of Man. .
 Jones, Michael Owen (1975). The hand made object and its maker. Berkeley: University of California. . .
 Georges, Robert A. and Jones, Michael Owen (1980). People Studying People : the Human Element in Fieldwork. Berkeley: University of California Press. . .
 Jones, Michael Owen; Giuliano, Bruce; Krell, Roberta (eds.) (1981). Foodways and eating habits: directions for research. Los Angeles, Calif.: California Folklore Society. .
 Jones, Michael Owen (ed.) (1987). The World of the Kalevala: essays in celebration of the 150 year jubilee of the publication of the Finnish national epic. Los Angeles: UCLA Folklore and Mythology Publications. . .
 Jones, Michael Owen; Moore, Michael Dane; Snyder, Richard Christopher (eds.) (1987). Inside organizations: understanding the human dimension. Newbury Park, Calif.: Sage. . .
 Jones, Michael Owen (1993). Exploring folk art twenty years of thought on craft, work, and aesthetics. Logan, Utah: Utah State University Press. . .
 Jones, Michael Owen (1989). Craftsman of the Cumberlands: tradition & creativity. Lexington, Ky.: Univ. Pr. of Kentucky. . .
 Jones, Michael Owen (ed.) (1994). Putting folklore to use. Lexington, Ky.: University Press of Kentucky. 1994. . .
 Georges, Robert A; Jones, Michael Owen (1995). Folkloristics: an introduction. Bloomington: Indiana University Press. . .
 Jones, Michael Owen (1996). Studying organizational symbolism: what, how, why?. Thousand Oaks, Calif.: Sage. . .
 Jones, Michael Owen (2017). Corn: a global history. London: Reaktion Books. . .
 Jones, Michael Owen; Long, Lucy M (eds.) (2017). Comfort food: meanings and memories. Jackson : University Press of Mississippi . .
 Jones, Michael Owen (2022). Frankenstein Was A Vegetarian: essays on food choice, identity, and symbolism. S.l.: University Press of Mississippi. . .

References

External links 
 Special Issue in Honor of Michael Owen Jones Western Folklore (Spring - Summer, 2008) Vol. 67, No. 2/3.

Living people
1942 births
Indiana University alumni
University of Kansas alumni
American folklorists
Presidents of the American Folklore Society